Sweet Soul Love is the third mini-album from Japanese singer Emi Tawata under the label Techesko. The album managed to reach the No. 284 spot on the Oricon ranking and charted for 1 week.
This third mini-album shows another side of Emi Tawatas style of music. This mini-album is more of the smooth R&B and Soul while her other 2 mini-albums were more of the Jazz kind. This mini-album contains 2 covers: one is from the well-known Japanese Jazz-singer Bird and one is from the famous reggae-singer Bob Marley

Track list

References 

2009 albums
Emi Tawata albums